Songs of Jimmie Rodgers is the debut album by Lefty Frizzell, released in 1951. It is a tribute album dedicated to the songs of Jimmie Rodgers.

Content
Frizzell recorded the album during his first sessions with Columbia Records. It was produced by Don Law.

Critical reception
No Depression called the album "one of country music’s finest tributes," writing that "the record has no fat; it is an unassuming joy and comfort."

Track listing

References

1952 albums
Lefty Frizzell albums